The Honor Rolls of Baseball were established in 1946 by the National Baseball Hall of Fame and Museum's Permanent Committee to establish as a second level of induction designed to recognize non-playing contributors. The committee designed the Honor Rolls to commemorate managers, executives, umpires and sportswriters, as an addition to their regular vote of old-time players. Though sportswriter Henry Chadwick was elected in 1938, the Hall had not devised a plan to extend recognition to these contributors, and this was the first attempt.

On April 23, 1946, the Permanent Committee voted to induct 11 players into the Baseball Hall of Fame, along with 39 non-players into the Honor Rolls, separated into their respective category. This second-tier list consisted of five managers, 11 umpires, 11 executives and 12 sportswriters.

Key

Honor Rolls of Baseball recipients

Executives

Managers

Umpires

Writers

See also
 List of members of the Baseball Hall of Fame

References
General
 Cook, William A. 2007. August Garry Herrmann: A Baseball Biography. McFarland. .
 James, Bill. 1995. Whatever happened to the Hall of Fame?: baseball, Cooperstown, and the politics of glory. Simon and Schuster. .
 Lieb, Fred; Ritter, Lawrence. 1977. Baseball As I Have Known It. University of Nebraska Press. .
 Redmount, Robert. 1998. The Red Sox Encyclopedia. Sports Publishing LLC. .
Specific

National Baseball Hall of Fame and Museum
+
+
+
Honor

Awards established in 1946
1946 establishments in the United States